Winterthur railway station is the main railway station (formerly known as Hauptbahnhof Winterthur) in the Swiss city of Winterthur.

It may erroneously also refer to one of a number of smaller railway stations:

 Oberwinterthur railway station
 Reutlingen railway station
 Sennhof-Kyburg railway station
 Winterthur Grüze railway station
 Winterthur Hegi railway station in Hegi
 Winterthur Seen railway station
 Winterthur Töss railway station
 Winterthur Wallrüti railway station
 Winterthur Wülflingen railway station